Aba is a city in the southeast of Nigeria and the commercial center of Abia State. Upon the creation of Abia state in 1991, Aba was divided into two local government areas; Aba South and Aba North. Aba South is the main city centre of Abia State, south-east Nigeria. It is located on the Aba River. Aba is made up of many villages such as; Aba-Ukwu, Eziukwu-Aba, Obuda-Aba, Umuokpoji-Aba and other villages from Ohazu merged due to administrative convenience. Aba was established by the Ngwa clan of Igbo people of Nigeria as a market town and then later a military post was placed there by the British colonial administration in 1901. It lies along the west bank of the Aba River, and is at the intersection of roads leading to Port Harcourt, Owerri, Umuahia, Ikot Ekpene, and Ikot-Abasi. The city became a collecting point for agricultural products following the British made railway running through it to Port Harcourt. Aba is a major urban settlement and commercial centre in a region that is surrounded by small villages and towns. The indigenous people of Aba are the Ngwa. Aba is well known for its craftsmen and also the most populous city in the South Eastern Nigeria. , Aba had an estimated population of 2,534,265. The state's slogan is "God's own State".

History
Aba as a City is made up of many villages namely; Aba-Ukwu, Eziukwu-Aba, Obuda-Aba and Umuokpoji-Aba but the villages in Ohazu have been merged with Aba so as to achieve administrative convenience. Aba-Ukwu is apparently the premier village in Aba, little wonder the late Eze W.E Ukaegbu of Aba-Ukwu was known and referred to as the 9th Grand Son of Aba.

It eventually became an administrative centre of Britain's colonial government. Aba has been a major commercial centre since it became part of the old Eastern region.

The Aro Expedition, which was part of a larger military plan to quell anti-colonial sentiment in the region, took place in the area of Aba during 1901 and 1902. During this military action, the British easily beat the native Aro people with an unknown number (presumed to be heavy) of casualties. In 1901, the British founded a military post in Aba and in 1915, a railroad was constructed to link it to Port Harcourt, which transported agricultural goods such as palm oil and palm kernels. In 1929 Aba was the site of a revolt by Igbo women, historically known as "The Aba Women's Riot", a protest of the colonial taxation policy. The riot started first as a peaceful protest against the initial census of women in the region, and subsequent assumed taxation of the women based upon rumour. The protests spread throughout the palm oil belt, but remained peaceful until a pregnant woman was knocked over during a "scuffle", and the lady losing her child. The news of this "act of abomination" spread rapidly and violent reactions ensued. After more deaths, some accidental, some not, occurred, a mass of 10,000 women marched on Aba. Sources dispute the numbers of dead, with 55 to over 100 being reported. By the 1930s, Aba was becoming a large urban community with an established industrial complex.

During the height of the Nigerian Civil War in 1967, the capital of Biafra was moved to Umuahia from Enugu. Aba was a very strategic Biafran city  and was heavily bombed and air raided during the Biafran War.

Aba is the home of many distinguished families such as the popular Emejiaka Egbu family of Aba la Ohazu, Ogbonna family of Eziukwu-Aba, the prestigious Ichita family of Umuokpoji-Aba, the Omenihu family of Obuda-Aba, the Ugbor family of Aba-Ukwu, the Ugwuzor family Umuokpoji Aba, the Ihemadu family of Ohabiam, the Ukaegbu family of Aba-ukwu, the Ahunanya family of Ohabiam and so forth.

Economy
Aba is surrounded by oil wells which separate it from the city of Port Harcourt. A  pipeline powers Aba with gas from the Imo River natural gas repository. Its major economic contributions are Textiles and Palm Oil along with pharmaceuticals, plastics, cement, and cosmetics. This trade makes the Ariaria International Market the second largest market in Nigeria after the Onitsha Main Market. There is also a Heineken brewery, a glass company and distillery within the city. Finally, it is famous for its handicrafts.

Aba is the commercial hub of eastern Nigeria. There are well known markets (such as Ariaria International Market, Ahia Ohuru (New Market), Eziukwu Road Market (Cemetery Market ), Shopping Centre (Ekeoha) etc.) that serve the entire region with wares, provisions, cosmetics, etc.

Source of electricity
Aba is powered by the Enugu Electricity Distribution Company, which was created by the breaking up of the Nigerian Electricity Power Authority, there is another electrical company that is yet to start power generation called the Geometric Power Company, if this starts the daily hours of electricity will improve in aba and the electricity generator is a household item in every home that can afford it, for some places in aba it is the only source of electricity.

Religion
The city has played a lasting role in the Christian evangelism of the Southeast of Nigeria since the British brought the Church Missionary Society (CMS), an evangelism vehicle of the Church of England used to plant what today has become the Anglican Church of Nigeria. The church named All the Saints, originated out of the evangelical initiative of three oil traders from Opopo-Joseph Cookey, Gabrial Coookey and Zedekiah Cookeys. These men sailed up the Aba Azumini Blue River in 1896 for their trading and also for the planting of the Christian religion. In 1897, they negotiated with Abayi and Umuocham people for land to establish their oil business at two beaches, which they built at Abayi waterside and Umuocham waterside. They traded oil producers from Ngwa the life, the word they preach, the religious cum trade relationship that transpired, the Cookeys converted the Abayi and Umuocham people to Christianity. From 1901 especially in 1902, they planned an intensive crusade and invited their landlords. This led to the planting of two congregations one at Abayi waterside and the other at Umuocham dedicated by James Johnson (Assistant Bishop of Western Equatorial Africa) (1900–1917). The earlier converts from Abayi and Umuocham attended service at St. Ambrose, Abayi Waterside Until 1905 when they set up their own Church -shade at Abayi and Umuocham respectively. Joseph Cookey was the volunteer teacher for Abayi while Gabriel Cookey was volunteer teaches for Umuocham.

St. Michael's Cathedral Anglican Church was founded in the late 1920s although St. James Parish on the city edge (Umule) is arguably the oldest church because the diocese's first mass was celebrated in 1916. Most of the Primary and Secondary Schools mentioned above were founded by the CMS along with each of their Churches.

Early Missionaries who first arrived Nigeria in 1842 established what is now called the Methodist Church Nigeria in Badagry. It quickly spread to Uzuakoli(about 50 kilometers from Aba) down to Aba. Wesley Cathedral was the first to be built. It became a Diocesan Headquarter and later an Archdiocese which proudly hosted the 2018 Methodist Conference. The Methodist Church is one of the most spiritually vibrant churches in the city of Aba.

In 1923, the Seventh-day Adventist Church (SDA Church) was established. The Seventh-day Adventists are well known for their Biblical faith, quality hospitals and good educational institutions.

The Catholic Church was to follow and also created many churches; Christ the King Church (C.K.C), which for a long time was the biggest church in the city became its bishop's seat and it is now known as Christ the King Cathedral.

With the arrival of the Pentecostal brand of Christianity in Nigeria, the city got an enormous share for itself. The Assemblies of God Church, being among the earliest, the Deeper Christian Life Ministry, Living Word Ministries Inc. had massive following in the early 1980s, following The Refiner's House International Church one of the newest and fastest-growing Christian ministries in the city. African Gospel Church was founded by Bishop Ogudoro the Founder of African Gospel church. African Gospel church is divided into 10 districts. The present Bishop of African Gospel church is Rev. Dr. Robert Lang'at (2009).

In the late 1960s, a group of Nigerians discovered information on the Church of Jesus Christ of Latter-day Saints and established branches, but the Utah-based church did not establish any official presence until 1978. The first stake of the Church in Nigeria and in fact in all of Africa outside of South Africa was established in Aba in 1988 with David W. Eka as president. There are presently four LDS stakes (collections of about 10 local congregations) headquartered in Aba and the only LDS Temple in Nigeria is located in the city, the Aba Nigeria Temple. There are two other temples announced for Lagos and Benin City.

Muslims and mosques are also present in Aba; the largest mosque is the Hospital Road Mosque. A Chief Imam is resident among the Hausa-speaking settlement in the heart of the city itself.

Education
The city has well over 90 primary schools, most running two sections of morning and afternoon. These sections, which are individual schools by themselves, operate 07:30Hrs – 12:30Hrs and 12:30Hrs – 17:30Hrs, all local time.

Transport
Aba is served by a station and a halt (mini station) on Nigerian Railways, but this is dilapidated and rarely used. Aba is also a major hub for road transport in the region—a large number of transport companies operate coaches that transport people daily to various parts of the country. The city is second only to Onitsha in mass transportation daily volume in the eastern part of Nigeria. Commercial motorcycles ("Okada") have been banned – replaced by commercial tricycles ("Keke NAPEP"), and minibus which popularity started in late 2015, and is popular as a means of transportation now.

In 2012, a monorail system was proposed. The plan was criticised as potentially a scam since the private company had no experience in developing monorails. As of 2021 there is no information that the proposal progressed passed the signing of a memorandum of understanding.

Sports
Enyimba International F.C., popularly called The Peoples Elephant, is the town's most popular association football club. Enyimba FC's winning record is among the richest of all Nigerian football clubs. With two CAF Champions League Trophies, six Nigeria Premier League titles and a pair of Federation Cup trophies, the club is currently ranked second in the CAF Club Rankings.

Waste management 

There are many problems with waste management in Aba, stemming from the lack of a regular garbage disposal, which means that trash piles up in the streets from the many markets that dot the city. Waste Management problems have been tried to be solved through the Federal and State Governments, however, the problems still exist, and have not been solved. (See also www.waste.org.ng for more recent pictures captured by a researcher on the tour of Aba)

"Made in Aba" merchandise mark

"Made in Aba" informally called "Aba Made" is a merchandise mark indicating that a product is all planned, manufactured and packed in Aba especially concerning the design, fashion, food, manufacturing, craftsmanship, and engineering industries.

See also 
 Enyimba International Stadium
 Ariaria International Market
 Railway stations in Nigeria
 Made in Aba

Notes

Footnotes

References
 
 
 
 
 
 
 
 
 Izugbara, C. O. and Umoh, J. O., 2004. Indigenous Waste Management Practices among the Ngwa of Southeastern Nigeria: Some lessons and policy implications. The Environmentalist. 24: 87–92.
 Nwanju, B.N. (1991). Government of Abia State: Decision on the Newly Created Local Government Areas. (Letter to the Sole Administrator of Aba LGA). SGA/S.0003/S.1/X

 
Cities in Abia State
1901 establishments in the Southern Nigeria Protectorate
Towns in Igboland
1901 establishments in Nigeria
Populated places established in 1901